Blinky, Pinky, Inky and Clyde, collectively known as the Ghost Gang, are a quartet of characters from the Pac-Man video game franchise. Created by Toru Iwatani, they first appear in the 1980 arcade game Pac-Man as the main antagonists. The ghosts have appeared in every Pac-Man game since, sometimes becoming minor antagonists or allies to Pac-Man, such as in Pac-Man World and the Pac-Man and the Ghostly Adventures animated series.

Some entries in the series went on to add other ghosts to the group, such as Sue in Ms. Pac-Man, Tim in Jr. Pac-Man, and Funky and Spunky in Pac-Mania; however, these did not appear in later games. The group has since gained a positive reception and is cited as one of the most recognizable video game villains of all time.

Concept and creation
The ghosts were created by Toru Iwatani, who was the head designer for the original Pac-Man arcade game. The idea for the ghosts was made from Iwatani's desire to create a video game that could attract women and younger players, particularly couples, at a time where most video games were "war"-type games or Space Invaders clones. In turn, he made the in-game characters cute and colorful, a trait borrowed from Iwatani's previous game Cutie Q (1979), which featured similar "kawaii" characters. Iwatani cited Casper the Friendly Ghost or Little Ghost Q-Taro as inspiration for the ghosts. Their simplistic design was also attributed to the limitations of the hardware at the time, only being able to display a certain amount of colors for a sprite. To prevent the game from becoming impossibly difficult or too boring to play, each of the ghosts were programmed to have their own distinct traits — the red ghost would directly chase Pac-Man, the pink and blue ghosts would position themselves in front of him, and the orange ghost would be random.

Originally, all four of the ghosts were meant to be red instead of multicolored, as ordered by Namco president Masaya Nakamura — Iwatani was against the idea, as he wanted the ghosts to be distinguishable from one another. Although he was admittedly afraid of Nakamura, he conducted a survey with his colleagues that asked if they wanted single-colored enemies or multicolored enemies. After being present with a 40-to-0 result in favor of multicolored ghosts, Nakamura agreed to the decision. The original Japanese version of the game had the ghosts named "Oikake", "Machibuse", "Kimagure" and "Otoboke", translating respectively to "chaser", "ambusher", "fickle" and "stupid". When the game was exported to the United States, Midway Games changed their names to "Shadow", "Speedy", "Bashful" and "Pokey", their nicknames being changed to "Blinky", "Pinky", "Inky" and "Clyde" respectively. Early promotional material would sometimes refer to the ghosts as "monsters" or "goblins".

Cartoons
In the 1982 Pac-Man cartoon, the hero faced five Ghosts — four males wearing various styles of hats, and a female ghost named Sue, who wore earrings. The Ghost Monsters work for Mezmaron, who assigns them the job of finding the Power Pellet Forest. 

In the 2013 TV series Pac-Man and the Ghostly Adventures, the four ghosts come from the Netherworld, ruled by Lord Betrayus. They are actually good-natured spirits and often secretly supply Pac-Man with information about Betrayus' plots to destroy Pac-World, hoping to one day be restored to life in exchange. Blinky was portrayed as the confident leader of the group; Inky was crafty, yet slightly nervous out of the bunch; Pinky was slightly vain, yet had an open crush on Pac-Man; while Clyde was slow-witted, but was more relaxed and friendly.

Known ghosts

Reception
The ghosts have received a positive reception from critics and have been cited as one of the most recognizable video game villains of all time. IGN commented on each of the ghosts having their own personality and "adorable" design. Boy's Life praised their simplicity and determination, labeling them as one of the most recognizable villains in video game history. In their list of the 50 "coolest" video game villains, Complex ranked the ghosts in as the fourth, noting of their iconic design and recognition and for being "pretty tough customers" Metro UK listed them at second place in their list of the ten greatest video game villains of all time, praising their easy recognition and cute designs.

Kotaku stated that the ghosts' artificial intelligence was still impressive by modern standards, being "smarter than you think". GamesRadar+ liked each of the ghosts having their own unique AI and traits, while GameSpy said that the ghosts' intelligence is one of the game's "most endearing" aspects for adding a new layer of strategy to the game.

Inky alone was ranked the seventh greatest game villain of all time by Guinness World Records in 2013, based on reader votes.

In popular culture

 In the Tiny Toon Adventures episode "Gang Busters", Buster Bunny and Plucky Duck play Pac-Man using their eyeballs as the characters. Buster plays as the ghosts.
 The Ghosts appear in The Simpsons episode "Homer and Ned's Hail Mary Pass", where they are seen at Pac-Man's wedding. They also appear in the episode "I Married Marge", where Mr. Burns is playing Ms. Pac-Man and laughs when he eats the ghosts.
 The Ghosts appear in the Futurama episode "Anthology of Interest II".
 The Ghosts appear in the South Park trilogy "Imaginationland".
 The Ghosts appear in the Family Guy episode "Stuck Together, Torn Apart", attempting to lift the spirits of a depressed, recently dumped Pac-Man, and in the episode "Meet the Quagmires", seen in the game Menstrual Ms. Pac-Man.
 The Ghosts appear in the Annoying Orange episodes "Pac-Mania", "TV OF TERROR", and "Annoying Orange vs. Ms. Pac-Man".
 In the Foster's Home for Imaginary Friends episode "Duchess of Wails", Duchess calls Mac and Bloo "Blinky and Clyde" in one scene.
 Blinky, Inky, Pinky, and Clyde appear in Wreck-It Ralph. While Blinky, Inky, and Pinky appear in Game Central Station, Clyde (voiced by Kevin Deters) is shown to be the head of Bad-Anon (a support group for video game villains) where the members have been meeting in the Pac-Man game once a week. When Wreck-It Ralph comments on how he does not want to be a villain anymore, Clyde is among the villains who react to this. When Ralph states he gets no respect from the other video game characters, Clyde understands how he feels, but says that he will have to accept who he is.
 Blinky, Inky, Pinky, and Clyde also appear in the sequel Ralph Breaks the Internet.
 The Ghosts appear in the MAD segment "Diary of a Wimpy Kid Icarus", where they are shown chasing Pac-Man, and in the segment "ParaMorgan", where they are shown with other popular fictional ghosts.
 The Ghosts appear in secret levels in Wolfenstein 3D.
 The Ghosts appeared in Abobo's Big Adventure as enemies on Contra Bobo. When Abobo hits them, they will turn blue and when Abobo hits scared ghosts, they will die with their eyes running offscreen.
 The Ghosts appear in Super Smash Bros. for Nintendo 3DS and Wii U and Super Smash Bros. Ultimate. Pac-Man uses them for his Smash attacks and they can also be summoned through an Assist Trophy. The Ghosts also wander in the Pac-Maze stage found in the 3DS version. They deal damage upon contact with other fighters and can be eaten by those who got a Power Pellet.
 In Pixels, four Mini Cooper cars played as the ghosts against a large pixelated vision of Pac-Man, created by aliens. They are the same colors as the ghosts and have license plates with their names. They are used by the main characters and the creator of Pac-Man.

References

Villains in animated television series
Fictional quartets
Ghost characters in video games
Namco antagonists
Pac-Man
Video game characters introduced in 1980